Buchanania is a genus of plants in the family Anacardiaceae and subfamily Anacardioideae.

Species
The following are included:
Buchanania amboinensis  Miq. — native to Papua New Guinea 
Buchanania axillaris (Desr.) Ramamoorthy — found in India
Buchanania arborescens (Blume) Blume — Satinwood or Lightwood, native to Taiwan, Indo-China, India, Malesia (including the Philippines), Papua New Guinea the Solomon Islands and Australia.
 Buchanania attenuata A.C.Sm.
 Buchanania barberi Gamble
 Buchanania cochinchinensis (Lour.) M.R.Almeida
 Buchanania engleriana Volkens
 Buchanania evrardii Tardieu
 Buchanania ferruginea Engl.
 Buchanania glabra Wall. ex Engl.
Buchanania insignis  — native to Borneo and the Philippines
Buchanania lanceolata Wight 
Buchanania lanzan Spreng. — chirauli-nut, native to India and Malaysia 
Buchanania latifolia Roxb. — chirauli-nut, native to China, India, Nepal, Laos, Myanmar, Thailand, and Vietnam.  
Buchanania macrocarpa Lauterb. — Solomon Islands, New Guinea, Maluku
Buchanania mangoides F.Muell. — native to Australia
 Buchanania merrillii Christoph.
Buchanania microphylla Engler — native to China and the Philippines
 Buchanania nitida Engl.
Buchanania obovata Engl. — Green Plum, native to Australia
Buchanania oxillaris fount is island of Lanka. Called Thimbiri in Singhalese
 Buchanania palawensis Lauterb.
Buchanania platyneura
 Buchanania reticulata Hance
Buchanania sessilifolia 
 Buchanania siamensis Miq.
Buchanania solomonensis Merr. & L.M.Perry — native to Papua  New Guinea 
Buchanania splendens 
Buchanania versteeghii Merr. & L.M.Perry — native to Papua New Guinea
Buchanania vitiensis Engl.
Buchanania yunnanensis C. Y. Wu native to China

References

External links

 
Taxonomy articles created by Polbot
Anacardiaceae genera